Michèle de Vaucouleurs is a French politician representing the Democratic Movement. She was elected to the French National Assembly on 18 June 2017, representing Yvelines's 7th constituency.

References

1964 births
Living people
People from Albertville
Deputies of the 15th National Assembly of the French Fifth Republic
Democratic Movement (France) politicians

Women members of the National Assembly (France)
21st-century French women politicians